"Harrowdown Hill" is a song by the singer Thom Yorke, released on 21 August 2006 as the first single from his debut solo album The Eraser. Yorke wrote it about the death of David Kelly, a British weapons expert who told a reporter that the British government had falsely identified weapons of mass destruction in Iraq. "Harrowdown Hill" reached number 23 on the UK Singles Chart. A music video was released on 31 July 2006.

Writing
"Harrowdown Hill" was released on Yorke's debut solo album, The Eraser (2006), recorded while Yorke's band Radiohead were on hiatus. According to the Globe and Mail, it resembles a love song with a sense of "menace" and "grim political showdown". Yorke said the song had been "kicking around" during the sessions for Radiohead's sixth album, Hail to the Thief (2003), but that it could not have worked as a Radiohead song.

The lyrics are about David Kelly, a British weapons expert who is presumed to have committed suicide in 2003 after telling a reporter that the British government had falsely identified weapons of mass destruction in Iraq. Kelly's body was found in the woods of Harrowdown Hill, near Yorke's former school in Oxfordshire. Yorke was uncomfortable about the subject matter and conscious of Kelly's grieving family, but felt that "not to write it would perhaps have been worse". In an interview with the Observer, he said it was "the most angry song" he had ever written. He told the Globe and Mail: "The government and the Ministry of Defence were implicated in his death. They were directly responsible for outing him and that put him in a position of unbearable pressure that he couldn't deal with, and they knew they were doing it and what it would do to him."

Music video
The "Harrowdown Hill" music video was directed by Chel White of BENT Image Lab in 2006. It features stop-motion eagle animation by David Russo, time-lapse footage by Mark Eiffert, and a technique known as Smallgantics. It was released on 31 July 2006 and was first played on Channel 4.

Release 
"Harrowdown Hill" was released on 21 August 2006, peaking at #23 in the UK Singles Chart. To celebrate the 2008 election of US president Barack Obama, Yorke released a remixed version of "Harrowdown Hill" as a free download.

Track listings
Promo CD
"Harrowdown Hill" (Early Fade)
"Harrowdown Hill" (Full Length)
7" XLS238, limited to 5,000 copies
"Harrowdown Hill" - 4:38
"Jetstream" - 3:44
CD XLS238CD, limited to 10,000 copies
"Harrowdown Hill" - 4:38
"The Drunkk Machine" - 4:07
"Harrowdown Hill" (extended mix) - 7:01
12" XLT238, limited to 3,000 copies
"Harrowdown Hill" (extended mix) - 7:01
"The Drunkk Machine" - 4:07
12" XLT238US
"Harrowdown Hill" (extended mix) - 7:01
"The Drunkk Machine" - 4:07
"Jetstream" - 3:44

See also
 List of anti-war songs

References

External links
 theeraser.net
 Thom Yorke page at the XL Recordings website.
 "Harrowdown Hill" music video at the XL recordings website.
 Radiohead Articles Archive: compiled reviews of "Harrowdown Hill"
 

2006 songs
2006 singles
Thom Yorke songs
XL Recordings singles
Songs written by Thom Yorke
Anti-war songs
Political songs
Song recordings produced by Nigel Godrich
Commemoration songs